The NWA British Commonwealth Heavyweight Championship is a professional wrestling championship that formerly served as the major title in the NWA UK Hammerlock promotion. The title is currently promoted by Dru Onyx's Torture Chamber Pro Wrestling Dojo along with the NWA Canadian Tag Team Championship.

History

Originally conceived as the brainchild of NWA UK Hammerlock promoter Andre Baker and Canadian Wrestling Federation promoter (and former NWA president) Ernie Todd, the title was created to have a non Board-controlled title that can be defended and promoted across continents, and also build positive working relationships between promoters, exchange talent and enhance the NWA product worldwide.

The NWA-affiliated promotions the title is defended in are NWA UK Hammerlock, NWA Ireland, NWA Quebec, Elite Canadian Championship Wrestling and NWA Pro. NWA Pro was included in 2006 due to having affiliate promotions in Australia. In the last thirteen years, the title has been defended or promoted in England, Wales, Ireland, Canada, the United States, Spain, the Netherlands, France and Barbados.

There are two criteria for the selection of champions: they have to be credible wrestlers with presence and have to be in a position to be able to travel and defend the title in both NWA and non-NWA promotions.

The title belt shows the flags of various nations, some currently members of the Commonwealth of Nations and some that are former members. The belt features the flags of the countries of the United Kingdom (displayed prominently on the center plate), Australia, Barbados, Canada, India, Jamaica, New Zealand, Singapore, and South Africa.

Reigns

Combined reigns

See also
List of National Wrestling Alliance championships
Professional wrestling in the United Kingdom
Professional wrestling promotions in the United Kingdom

References

External links
Wrestling-Titles.com

NWA UK Hammerlock championships
National Wrestling Alliance championships
Heavyweight wrestling championships
National professional wrestling championships